Rise Wrestling is an all-female professional wrestling promotion. Since 2016, it has held more than 50 events and internet pay-per-views, as well as taping shows called RISE Ascent, which airs on their Twitch channel.

RISE 1: Ignite

RISE 2: Ascent

GAIN 1: Stand with Knights

RISE 3: Medic

Bellatrix 26/RISE 4: Warriors Rise

RISE 5: Rising Sun

Six-way elimination match

RISE 6: Brutality

Eight-intengender elimination tag team match

RISE 6.5: Throttle

RISE 7: Sensation

Six-woman elimination tag team match

RISE 7.5: Steel

RISE 8: Outback

Four-way elimination match

RISE 9: RISE of The Knockouts

RISE 10: Insanity

RISE 12: ROW on the Rise

RISE Early to Rise

RISE 13: Legendary

RISE 14: Luminous

Eight-woman elimination tag team match

RISE Pride and Joy

Intergender six-way elimination match

RISE Regional Rising Stars Tournament - The Midwest Bracket

RISE Early to Rise 2

RISE La Escalera

References

Impact Wrestling shows
Women's professional wrestling shows